Deception Point is a 2001 mystery-thriller novel by American author Dan Brown. It is Brown's third novel. It was published by Simon & Schuster.

The novel follows White House intelligence analyst Rachel Sexton's involvement in corroborating NASA's discovery of a meteorite that supposedly contains proof of extraterrestrial life, resembling the ALH84001 case. The discovery comes at a time close to the United States presidential election in which her father is running. The discovery will aid the campaign of her employer, the incumbent president of the United States, Zachary Herney, but put her further at odds with her already estranged father, Senator Sedgwick Sexton, a senator who is running for election. Ms. Sexton, accompanied by a team of experts, must uncover the authenticity of the meteorite which will either make or break the campaign of President Herney.

Plot
On the eve of a United States presidential election, NASA discovers a meteorite in the Milne Ice Shelf containing an insect-like creature, seemingly proving the existence of extraterrestrial life. The discovery could potentially be a deciding factor in the presidential election, in which one of the key issues is whether to continue funding NASA. Incumbent US President Zachary Herney favors supporting space research, while his challenger Senator Sedgewick Sexton argues for dissolving NASA.

President Herney sends a team of experts to the Arctic to verify the authenticity of the extraterrestrial insect: oceanographer Michael Tolland, astrophysicist Corky Marlinson, glaciologist Norah Mangor, paleontologist Wailee Ming, and National Reconnaissance Office employee Rachel Sexton, Senator Sexton's daughter.

When the scientists find an anomaly that calls the authenticity of NASA's discovery into question, they're attacked by a Delta Force team that had secretly been spying on them. The Delta Force soldiers kill Ming and Mangor while leaving Rachel, Tolland and Marlinson to perish on an ice floe, but they're rescued by the Navy submarine USS Charlotte. Rachel alerts presidential advisor Marjorie Tench and NRO director William Pickering of the attack, and Pickering sends an air transport to bring them back to the United States.

Meanwhile, in Washington, D.C., Tench tries to sabotage Sexton's campaign by blackmailing his aide Gabrielle Ashe with photos of an extramarital affair that she had with Senator Sexton, and reveals that Sexton is secretly backed by a coalition of private aerospace corporations who would profit from NASA's dissolution. Ashe discovers that Tench's claims are true, but also finds out that NASA lied about the origin of the meteorite.

The surviving scientists retreat to Tolland's research ship off the New Jersey coast, where they fully re-analyze their data and discover that the meteorite is fake. A surprise attack by the Delta Force team prompts Rachel to fax the data to her father, asking for help. In the ensuing skirmish, all Delta Force soldiers are killed, their helicopter is sunk, and Pickering is revealed to be their commander. Pickering reveals that he masterminded the fake meteorite to aid Herney's campaign and prevent the dissolution of NASA. The ship and Pickering are sucked in by a vortex, while a Coast Guard Osprey picks up Rachel, Tolland and Marlinson.

Sexton attempts to reveal Rachel's fax in a press conference in hopes of implicating NASA and the president in the meteorite hoax, but Rachel and Gabrielle swap Rachel's fax with the photo evidence of Sexton's affair with Gabrielle, humiliating him and ruining his chances of winning the election. By the end of the story, Michael and Rachel have developed a romantic relationship.

Characters
Authentication team: During the story, NASA invites five external experts to help authenticate the meteorite finding as secondary sources:

 Rachel Sexton: A data analyst for NRO and Senator Sexton's daughter, Rachel's relationship with her father is antagonistic because of his infidelity, which indirectly contributed to her mother's death in an accident. Her involvement in the authentication is eventually proven to be purely political.
 Michael Tolland: An oceanographer and television celebrity-scientist, Tolland possesses excellent educational and social skills and does not exhibit unchecked anger, as other characters do. Tolland can remain calm under fire and think out of the box. Having lost his wife to cancer, Tolland gradually develops a crush on Rachel.
 Corky Marlinson: A world-renowned astrophysicist and a staunch proponent of the authenticity of the meteorite, Corky has little knowledge of proper social conduct. Corky survives a shark attack.
 Norah Mangor: A prickly glaciologist, Norah has a tough, tomboyish personality; she is suffocated with ice and snow early in the book by Pickering's death squad and was thrown into the Arctic Ocean along with her sled.
 Wailee Ming: A paleontologist with an impeccable dress habit; he is drowned early in the book by Pickering's death squad when he attempted to investigate an irregularity in the extraction hole.

Politicians:
 Zachary Herney: The President of the United States, criticized for his extravagant expenditure of U.S. money on low-yield areas (including the allegedly futile search for extraterrestrial life) while the important areas of nation (such as education) suffer from the lack of funds. The events of the story lead him into revising government extravagance.
 Senator Thomas Sedgewick Sexton: Rachel's father and an ambitious presidential candidate in the book. Senator Sexton is corrupt, promiscuous, and ruthless: he accepts bribes, engages in several extramarital affairs and even would sacrifice his daughter to crush his political opponent harder, but the consequences of his actions eventually destroy his political standing. Because of his ego, he does not take computer security seriously and chooses weak passwords for his computer.
 Marjorie Tench: Senior Adviser to the president. Described as very astute and ruthless, she anonymously sends information about the president's expenditure in NASA to lure Sexton into attacking the organization. Tench has kept the meteorite discovery a secret, intending to use it as a justification for the expenditure, making Sexton's criticism backfire. When Rachel informs her of the fake nature of the meteorite, Tench attempts to hush it up before being killed by Pickering's death squad.
 Gabrielle Ashe: Senator Sexton's aide and one-time mistress, she relays information about NASA's extravagance to Senator Sexton. When the senator's campaign collapses, she infiltrates NASA to help salvage the campaign by finding potential evidences of falsification. Gabrielle later threatens to expose her one-time illegitimate affair to dissuade Sexton from sacrificing her daughter for his political ambitions. Failing to succeed, she and Rachel cooperate to replace the meteorite fiasco evidence with photos of said affair.

NASA:
 Lawrence Ekstrom: Administrator of NASA; serves no purpose in the book beyond attracting suspicion.
 Chris Harper: NASA section manager; he appears in four dedicated chapters and explains how NASA did not find the meteorite as claimed.

NRO:
 William Pickering: The main antagonist, director of NRO and the handler of the Delta Force team featured in the book, he is the mastermind behind main plot line. Pickering's intention is to help president Herney maintain the office for ulterior motivations of his own: his ultimate goal is to make NASA a division of NRO, thus rendering its operations clandestine. He and the Delta Force team under his command would kill anyone who is a threat to his plan, even Marjorie Tench, the president's adviser, who once had disagreed with him. Pickering is sucked into a vortex.
 Delta Force team: A team of three, apparently male, they are the death squad of William Pickering and have access to state-of-the-art technology of the time, such as surveillance microbots, an Aurora aircraft, a Kiowa Warrior helicopter and weapons that manufacture their own munitions. All three were killed: Two were eaten by sharks and their leader was drowned inside a Kiowa Warrior.

References

2001 American novels
Novels by Dan Brown
Techno-thriller novels
Novels about NASA
Novels set in the Arctic
2000s science fiction novels
Military science fiction novels
American mystery novels
American thriller novels